Walter Keeler (also Keiler) (born 1615) was a founding settler of Norwalk, Connecticut. There is very little information on him in the historical records. He is listed among the "Table of Estates" settlers of 1655. He is the brother of Ralph Keeler, the Norwalk settler who is listed among the "Ludlow Agreement" settlers of 1650.

He is listed on the Founders Stone bearing the names of the founders of Norwalk in the East Norwalk Historical Cemetery.

References 

1615 births
American Puritans
Founding settlers of Norwalk, Connecticut
People from Tendring (district)
Year of death missing